"Chan Mali Chan" is a malay folk song popular in Malaysia and Singapore. The song is actually based on a Malay poem (pantun) about a person searching for their pet goat, but in reality, is a cheeky representation of courtship between a man and a woman. The song was sung in the 1960 Singapore black-white film, Isi Neraka.

Indonesians believe the song originally came from East Nusa Tenggara, titled "Anak Kambing Saya" ("My Lamb" or "My Baby Goat") has been attributed to Saridjah Niung even though she is not from that region. It is commonly sung as a children's song.

Lyrics
There are many variations in the lyrics found in Indonesia, Malaysia and Singapore.

Version in Malaysia and Singapore
A common version found in Malaysia and Singapore: 

(The verses may be repeated with the same or different questions and answers.)

Version in Indonesia
This is a popular Indonesian version attributed to Saridjah Niung:

Notes

See also

 Soleram
 Rasa sayang

References

Indonesian
Indonesian music
Indonesian folk songs
Indonesian culture
Malaysian folk songs
Malaysian children's songs
Singapore